The Battle of Kalisz took place on 29 October 1706 in Kalisz, Polish–Lithuanian Commonwealth during the Great Northern War. The battle was fought by Russian cavalry along with allied Saxon and Polish forces, led by commander Aleksandr Menshikov; against a smaller Swedish force headed by colonel Arvid Axel Mardefelt and resulted in an allied victory. By this time the Polish forces under Augustus the Strong had signed a peace treaty with the Swedes, but August had delayed informing his Russian allies, leading to the battle.

Prelude
Charles XII of Sweden's victory in the Battle of Fraustadt had forced August the Strong of the Electorate of Saxony to drop out of the Great Northern War and abdicate his claims to the Polish crown in the Treaty of Altranstädt, marking an end to the Civil war in Poland (1704-1706).

August himself, however, was with the Russian commander Menshikov and the third Russian army, which numbered 18,000 Russians. These were sent by Tsar Peter after the previous two had been defeated and dispersed after the battles of Fraustadt and Grodno. August had not informed Menshikov of the peace treaty because of the large contributions from Russia, and tried to avoid a battle, as he knew that his deceit would anger the swedes.

August secretly sent a letter to the Swedish major general Arvid Axel Marderfelt who was in command of the small Swedish army stationed in western Poland. August declared that the peace was almost concluded, and that he hoped to be informed of this by the Swedish king, Charles XII, and that a battle would thus be avoided. Marderfelt had, however, not been informed of this (the couriers had most likely been killed by kossacks). Marderfelt thus concluded that the letter was yet another of Augusts' deceits and replied that he had not received any information of the peace and would stand his ground in the case of a battle. In reality, he was more concerned than he wished to admit.

Battle
The Swedes had about 4,358 men present in the vicinity of which one regiment and two battalions consisted of foreign troops captured in the Battle of Fraustadt, while their Polish and Lithuanian allies could field around 9,000–10,000 men. The anti-Swedish coalition army was twice as large and included 5,000 Saxons under Augustus II the Strong, 7,000 Poles and Lithuanians under Adam Mikołaj Sieniawski and 9,000 Russians with equally many Cossacks and Kalmyks in Russian service under Alexander Danilovich Menshikov. In total 30,000 men according to their own stories.

To the number, the Swedish army was vastly outnumbered with only 4 000 infantry troops, if it had not been for the allied Polish and Lithuanian cavalry. Mardefelt did not wish to engage the much larger Russian army, but the commander of the Polish crown army, Józef Potocki, insisted on chasing the Russians out of the country. Mardefelt pointed out carefully that the Poles had not been keen on fighting Russians or anyone at all during the war, but Potocki convinced him that this time they would fight to the last drop of blood.

When the battle commenced, the Swedish infantry lined up in the middle with the Polish and Lithuanians on the sides, protecting the flank. When the Russians advanced, the Poles immediately fled the battlefield and thus left the Swedish flank exposed. The Swedish infantry fought on, even though the outcome would be obvious.

Aftermath
In the battle and its immediate aftermath the Swedes and their Polish allies suffered 2,000 men killed and another 2,900 captured of which about 700 killed were Swedes with at least 1,800 captured. The Russian–Polish–Saxon counterpart lost up to 3,000 men in the battle of which, according to their own stories of two letters written after the battle, 806 killed and equally many wounded belonged to the Saxons and other Germans while the Russians (possibly with the irregular Cossacks and Kalmyks) had sustained 500 killed and 800 wounded. Another source mentions only 84 killed with another 324 wounded for the Russians.

The Swedish defeat was rendered moot when Charles XII exposed Augustus' ratification of the Altranstädt treaty, whereupon the latter gave in to obey by its terms and withdrew to Saxony by November.

Also, although he had planned to originally renounce the Treaty of Altranstädt, Augustus went along with its terms. Finally 1,800 Swedish prisoners were returned.

References

Bibliography

Jan Wimmer: The Battle of Kalisz
Robert K. Massie: Peter the Great

Kalisz
1706 in Europe
Conflicts in 1706
Kalisz
Kalisz
Kalisz
Kalisz
History of Greater Poland Voivodeship
1706 in the Polish–Lithuanian Commonwealth